Jean-Paul Dupré (born 5 February 1944 in Davejean, Aude) French millionaire, member of the National Assembly of France from 1997 to 2017.  He represented Aude's 3rd constituency, as a member of the Socialist Party and of the Socialiste, radical, citoyen et divers gauche parliamentary group. He is the mayor of Limoux.

References

1944 births
Living people
People from Aude
Socialist Party (France) politicians
Mayors of places in Occitania (administrative region)
People from Limoux
Deputies of the 11th National Assembly of the French Fifth Republic
Deputies of the 12th National Assembly of the French Fifth Republic
Deputies of the 13th National Assembly of the French Fifth Republic
Deputies of the 14th National Assembly of the French Fifth Republic